The East St. Louis and Suburban Railway was an interurban railroad that operated in Illinois.

Route
It served Madison County, St. Clair County, and Monroe County as part of the great "East Side Electric Railway System."  It stretched from the Eads Bridge, which crossed the Mississippi River from East St. Louis, Illinois to St. Louis, Missouri, east to Lebanon, and from Alton, to Waterloo.  This railroad moved commuters and express freight among various towns in the East St. Louis area including Belleville, Collinsville, Waterloo, Columbia, Granite City, National City, French Village, and O'Fallon.

History
The system expanded during the industrial growth of St. Louis in the late 19th century, spilling across the Mississippi River to the cheaper land on the Illinois side.  From 1870 to 1910, East St. Louis and the surrounding area attracted industrial development to the transportation hub.  During this period, the population of East St. Louis nearly doubled each decade.  Amidst this growth, the East St. Louis and Suburban grew by acquiring shorter interurban lines.  The Illinois Traction System reached St. Louis via trackage rights on the East St. Louis and Suburban over the Eads Bridge until the completion of the McKinley Bridge. The Illinois Terminal Railroad later purchased the Alton Line.  The East St. Louis and Suburban shared a car barn on Ridge Ave. in East St. Louis with the St. Louis and Belleville Electric Railway, which was also part of the Great East Side Electric Railway System.  The system was abandoned sectionally during the 1930s.

Defunct Illinois railroads
Defunct Missouri railroads
Interurban railways in Illinois
Interurban railways in Missouri
Streetcars in Greater St. Louis
Electric railways in Illinois